The Blomberg is a mountain, 1,248 m high, in Bavaria, Germany and is the local mountain of Bad Tölz and a popular destination both with locals and visitors to the region. It is accessible on a short footpath which is steep in places or with the aid of a chairlift.

Location and area 
The Blomberg lies within the Bavarian Prealps in the parish of Wackersberg. At 1,203 m is a managed inn, the Blomberghaus. In addition there is a 1,286-metre-long  summer rodelbahn and, since mid-2008, a ropes course.

Immediately to the south is a neighbouring peak, the 1,348 m high Zwiesel (also called the Zwieselberg). As close neighbours, the Blomberg and Zwiesel are often visited together. The nearby Heiglkopf is also easy to reach from the summit of the Blomberg. Both mountains may be climbed by children and are occasionally recommended as such.

During the Würm glaciation the alpentor of the  Isar valley glacier was formed between the Blomberg and the Rechelkopf.

Winter sports 
In winter the small ski area with its old double chairlift and two drag lifts is used especially by day visitors from the surrounding area as far as Munich. The 5.5-km-long winter toboggan run, built in 1903, is popular and very busy at weekends.

References

External links 

 The Blomberghaus
 The Blombergbahn
 The Kletterwald Blomberg

One-thousanders of Germany
Ski areas and resorts in Germany
Mountains of Bavaria
Bavarian Prealps
Bad Tölz-Wolfratshausen
Mountains of the Alps